Moodna clitellatella is a species of snout moth in the genus Moodna. It was described by Ragonot in 1888, and is known from Peru (including Callao, the type location).

References

Moths described in 1888
Phycitinae